Karl Schmedes (November 14, 1908 – May 31, 1981) was a German boxer who competed in the 1936 Summer Olympics.

He was born in Dortmund.

In 1936 he was eliminated in the first round of the lightweight class after losing his fight to José Padilla.

1936 Olympic results
Below is the record of Karl Schmedes, a German lightweight boxer who competed at the 1936 Berlin Olympics:

 Round of 32: lost to José Padilla (Philippines) by decision

External links
 

1908 births
1981 deaths
Sportspeople from Dortmund
Lightweight boxers
Olympic boxers of Germany
Boxers at the 1936 Summer Olympics
German male boxers
20th-century German people